The 2013 SMT Shipping Topklasse season is contested between eight teams playing in one single division. Each team plays all the others in their division both home and away.
At the end of the 2013 season, HBS Craeyenhout relegated to Hoofdklasse (Dutch 2nd level cricket division). At the end of the three final matches H.V. & C.V. QUICK became the 2013 Topklasse champion with VRA being the runner-up.

Teams
A total of 8 teams are taking part in the league

Group stage

Last updated 29 July 2013.

Color legend

May

June

July

Play-off stage

Championship play-offs

Relegation play-offs

Best-of-three championship final

External links
  Official Website

Cricket in the Netherlands
2013 in Dutch sport
2013 in cricket